Lipnik is a small settlement in the Municipality of Trebnje in eastern Slovenia. The municipality is included in the Southeast Slovenia Statistical Region. The entire area is part of the historical region of Lower Carniola.

References

External links
Lipnik at Geopedia

Populated places in the Municipality of Trebnje